Magot (pronounced mă-gō) may refer to:

The Barbary macaque (Macaca sylvanus)
Magot (figurine), a type of figurine which the Les Deux Magots café in Paris is named after

People with the name
Ajak Magot (born 1992), South Sudanese basketball player

See also
Maggot, the wormlike larva of flies.